Vijay Hari Zol (born 23 November 1994) is an Indian cricketer. He is a left-handed middle-order batsman who plays for Maharashtra. He is from Jalna, Maharashtra.

In 2012, he signed a youth contract with the IPL franchise Royal Challengers Bangalore. He was also a member of India Under-19 cricket team. He was selected as the captain of Indian under 19 cricket  team 2014.

Under-19s Career
In December 2011, in an Under-19 first-class match for Maharashtra cricket team. Zol scored an unbeaten 451 off 467 deliveries, batting for almost eleven hours and hitting 53 boundaries and two sixes in the record-breaking inning.

Though there are no official records to verify exactly where he stands in the record books in youth cricket, Zol's score was higher than Bhausaheb Nimbalkar's landmark 443, the highest first-class score by an Indian set in 1948 during a Ranji Trophy match between Maharashtra and Saurashtra cricket team.

Previously, he scored a double-century against Gujarat in the league stage of 2010's Vijay Merchant tournament. He was also a member of India Under-19 team that won Asia Cup jointly with Pakistan. He was the man of the match in the final which ended in tie.

After Asia Cup, he was appointed as the vice-captain of the team for 2012 ICC Under-19 Cricket World Cup in Australia. He played a crucial role for team in the World Cup. His batting at number 3 was well appreciated by cricketing greats.

He was in red-hot form having posted scores of 128, 173 and 128 in 2013. He produced another compelling batting display blasting 10 fours and two sixes during his 115-ball 103, and added vital stands of 67, 53 and 67 for the second, third and fourth wickets with Shubham Khajuria, Shreyas Iyer and Ricky Bhui.

Under his captaincy India under-19 team won the Quadrangular Series in 2013-14. Out of the 6 matches played in the tournament India won 4 of them and 1 match ended without any result. Zol was the top run-scorer for India in the final as India crushed South Africa by 201 runs. Vijay zol was named the captain of the Under-19 Indian Cricket team in 2014 for the ICC Under-19 Cricket World Cup in Dubai.   India were defeated in the tightly contested quarter-final tie by England in which the Indian captain scored 48 runs.

Domestic career

He made his List "A" debut in February 2012 against Baroda.  He scored 27 off 44 balls with 5 fours in his first visit to crease. In 2012, he signed a youth contract with the IPL team Royal Challengers Bangalore.

In 2013, he was named in the India “A” squad for the long-format matches against the touring New Zealand “A” team. Zol scored a maiden century on his first-class debut in his 1st unofficial Test at Visakhapatnam.

Record
In December 2011, in an Under-19 first-class match for Maharashtra. Zol scored an unbeaten 451 off 467 deliveries, batting for almost eleven hours, and hit 53 boundaries and two sixes in that record-breaking innings.

Awards
Best Under-16 Cricketer 2011
MA Chidambaram Award for the Best U-19 Cricketer

References

External links
Vijay Zol at Cricinfo
Vijay Zol Profile and latest news at Sportskeeda
Vijay Zol IPL Profile from RoyalChallengers
 

1994 births
Living people
Indian cricketers
Maharashtra cricketers
Royal Challengers Bangalore cricketers
West Zone cricketers
People from Marathwada